Istvan Bakx (born 20 January 1986) is a Dutch former professional footballer. He was a left-footed winger, and could also be used as a striker.

Club career
Bakx was discovered by Sparta Rotterdam in 2005, while he was playing for VV Kloetinge in the Hoofdklasse, the highest Dutch amateur league. At the end of the season, Sparta offered Bakx a new contract. But Bakx refused to sign, opting to focus on his school career, and went to HSV Hoek, another team playing in the Hoofdklasse. Bakx was chosen as Player of the Year at the end of his season in Hoek. In July 2007, Bakx went to Belgian second division side KV Kortrijk. He promoted with Kortrijk to the highest level of Belgian football. When his manager and discoverer Hein Vanhaezebrouck signed for RC Genk after the 2008-09 season, he took Bakx with him.

The Google Striker
Bakx gained some notability in Belgium with his transfer to Kortrijk. Manager Hein Vanhaezebrouck was searching for a left-footed attacker and had typed in those words at search engine Google. Search results showed a positive report on Bakx, and Vanhaezebrouck contacted Kortrijk's head scout. As these scouting reports were also positive, Bakx' transfer to Kortrijk became a fact. As a result, Belgian media nicknamed Bakx the Google striker. Bakx impressed in Belgium as part of the KV Kortrijk side that chalked up a shock 5-1 Belgian Cup victory against AA Gent, in which Bakx scored a hat-trick. Sadly for Bakx and Kortrijk, Gent won the return 4-0, defeating Kortrijk on aggregate.

South Africa
On 26 July 2019, SV Spakenburg announced that Bakx had joined the club. But however, one month later, he left the club again to join South African club Ajax Cape Town.

Return to Hoek
In September 2020, Bakx returned to HSV Hoek after leaving the club 13 years earlier.

International career
On 13 March 2008, Bakx was taken up into the pre-selection for Netherlands national under-21 for the match against Estonia.

References

External links 
 
 Footgoal Profile

1986 births
Living people
Sportspeople from Vlissingen
Dutch footballers
Association football wingers
Association football forwards
Sparta Rotterdam players
HSV Hoek players
K.V. Kortrijk players
K.R.C. Genk players
FC Den Bosch players
Willem II (football club) players
AGOVV Apeldoorn players
TOP Oss players
Go Ahead Eagles players
SV Spakenburg players
Cape Town Spurs F.C. players
Eredivisie players
Eerste Divisie players
Belgian Pro League players
Challenger Pro League players
South African Premier Division players
Dutch expatriate footballers
Expatriate footballers in Belgium
Dutch expatriate sportspeople in Belgium
Expatriate soccer players in South Africa
Dutch expatriate sportspeople in South Africa
Netherlands under-21 international footballers
VV Kloetinge players
Footballers from Zeeland